November 9 - Eastern Orthodox liturgical calendar - November 11

All fixed commemorations below celebrated on November 23 by Orthodox Churches on the Old Calendar.

For November 10th, Orthodox Churches on the Old Calendar commemorate the Saints listed on October 28.

Saints
 Apostles of the Seventy Disciples:
 Erastus of Paneas, Olympas, Herodion of Patras, Sosipater of Iconium, Quartus and Tertius of Iconium (Terence) (1st century)
 Hieromartyr Demetrianos of Antioch, Bishop of Antioch, martyred in Persia (256)
 Martyr Orestes of Cappadocia (304)
 Martyr Orion, by being buried alive.
 Martyr Kalliopios, by the sword.
 Martyr Niro, by the sword. 
 Hieromartyr Milos (Miles) the Wonderworker, Bishop in Persia, and his disciples, Martyrs Euores the Presbyter and Seboes the Deacon (c. 341) martyrs of Persia under Shapur II  (see also: October 20)
 Saint Martin of Terracina, Bishop of Terracina (c. 4th century).
 Venerable Nonnus, Bishop of Heliopolis, and the catechist of Saint Pelagia (471)
 Ten Martyrs of Gaza, at Jerusalem (638):
 Callinius, Imerius, Diasimus, Theodore, Stephen, Peter, Paul, Theodore, John, and John.
 Venerable Theocteristus, Abbot, of Symbola Monastery on Mt. Olympus in Bithynia (8th century).  (see also: February 17)
 Great Martyr Constantine-Kakhi, grand prince of Kartli, Georgia (852)

Pre-Schism Western saints
 Saint Probus I, the sixth Bishop of Ravenna (c. 175)
 Saints Tiberius, Modestus and Florentia, martyrs under Diocletian at Agde in the south of France (303)
 Saint Leo the Great, Pope of Rome, Confessor (461)  (see also: February 18 - East)
 Saint Monitor, twelfth Bishop of Orleans in France, Confessor (c. 490)
 Saint Áed mac Bricc, a disciple of St Illadan at Rathlihen in Offaly in Ireland, Bishop (589)
 Saint Elaeth the King, a Briton driven into Wales by the Picts, he became a monk with St Seiriol in Anglesey in Wales (6th century)
 Saint Justus of Canterbury, the fourth Archbishop of Canterbury, Confessor (627-631)
 Saint Adelin of Séez (Adelheim), a monk and Abbot of Saint-Calais, then Bishop of Séez in France (c. 910)
 Saint Guerembaldus, a monk at Hirschau in Germany, who out of humility refused to become Bishop of Spire (965)

Post-Schism Orthodox saints
 Venerable Arsenios the Cappadocian (1924)  (see also: October 28 - Russian)

New martyrs and confessors
 Hieromartyr Boris Semenov, Deacon, Martyr Nicholas Smirnov, and Virgin-martyr Anna Ostroglazova (1930's)
 New Hieromartyr Niphon (Vyblov), hieromonk, of Berezovy Khutor, Saratov (1931)
 Martyr Alexander Medem (1931)
 New Hieromartyr Procopius (Titov), Archbishop of Kherson (1937)
 New Hieromartyrs Dionisius Shchegolev, John Skadovsky, and Peter Pavlushkov, Priests (1937)
 New Hieromartyrs Augustine (Belyaev), Archbishop of Kaluga, and with him (1937):
 John Speransky, Archpriest, of Kaluga;
 Ioannicius (Dmitriev), Archimandrite, of the St. George Monastery, Meshchevsk; 
 Seraphim (Gushchin), Hieromonk of Optina Monastery;
 New Martyrs Alexei Gorbachev, Apollonius Babichev, and Michael Arefeyev.
 New Martyr Olga Maslennikova (1941)
 New Martyr Theoctista Chentsova (1942)

Other commemorations
 Commemoration of the beginning of the torture of Great-martyr George (303)
 Translation of the relics (1935) of St. Gregory, Bishop of Assos near Ephesus (1150), to Lesvos.  (On the Sunday between November 11–17 each year.)
 Glorification of St. Matthew, monk, of Yaransk, Wonderworker (1997)

Icon gallery

Notes

References

Sources
 November 10/November 23. Orthodox Calendar (PRAVOSLAVIE.RU).
 November 23 / November 10. HOLY TRINITY RUSSIAN ORTHODOX CHURCH (A parish of the Patriarchate of Moscow).
 November 10. OCA - The Lives of the Saints.
 The Autonomous Orthodox Metropolia of Western Europe and the Americas (ROCOR). St. Hilarion Calendar of Saints for the year of our Lord 2004. St. Hilarion Press (Austin, TX). p. 84.
 The Tenth Day of the Month of November. Orthodoxy in China.
 November 10. Latin Saints of the Orthodox Patriarchate of Rome.
 The Roman Martyrology. Transl. by the Archbishop of Baltimore. Last Edition, According to the Copy Printed at Rome in 1914. Revised Edition, with the Imprimatur of His Eminence Cardinal Gibbons. Baltimore: John Murphy Company, 1916. pp. 346–347.
 Rev. Richard Stanton. A Menology of England and Wales, or, Brief Memorials of the Ancient British and English Saints Arranged According to the Calendar, Together with the Martyrs of the 16th and 17th Centuries. London: Burns & Oates, 1892. pp. 533–534.

 Greek Sources
 Great Synaxaristes:  10 ΝΟΕΜΒΡΙΟΥ. ΜΕΓΑΣ ΣΥΝΑΞΑΡΙΣΤΗΣ.
  Συναξαριστής. 10 Νοεμβρίου. ECCLESIA.GR. (H ΕΚΚΛΗΣΙΑ ΤΗΣ ΕΛΛΑΔΟΣ).
  10/11/2016. Ορθόδοξος Συναξαριστής.

 Russian Sources
  23 ноября (10 ноября). Православная Энциклопедия под редакцией Патриарха Московского и всея Руси Кирилла (электронная версия). (Orthodox Encyclopedia - Pravenc.ru).
  10 ноября по старому стилю  /  23 ноября по новому стилю. Русская Православная Церковь - Православный церковный календарь на 2016 год.

November in the Eastern Orthodox calendar